Pont, meaning "bridge" in French, may refer to:

Places

France
 Pont, Côte-d'Or, in the Côte-d'Or département
 Pont-Bellanger, in the Calvados département
 Pont-d'Ouilly, in the Calvados département 
 Pont-Farcy, in the Calvados département 
 Pont-l'Évêque, Calvados, in the Calvados département
 Pont-l'Évêque, Oise, in the Oise département

Elsewhere
 Pont, Cornwall, England
 Pontarddulais, Swansea, Wales
 Pontypridd, Rhondda Cynon Taf, Wales
  in Ponteland, Northumberland
Du Pont, Switzerland, in the commune of L'Abbaye, Switzerland

Other
 Pont (surname)
 Pont (Haiti), a political party led by Jean Marie Chérestal
 Pont Rouelle, a bridge in Paris, France
 Du Pont family
 Graham Laidler (1908–1940), British cartoonist, "Pont" of Punch magazine
 PONT, time zone abbreviation for Ponape Time (Micronesia), UTC+11:00

See also
 Dupont (surname)
 DuPont, the company
 Dupont (disambiguation)
 Ponte (disambiguation)